Ecuadorian Civil War may refer to any of the following civil wars in Ecuador:
 War of the Generals (1911–1912)
 Ecuadorian Civil War of 1913–1916
 Ecuadorian Civil War of 1930

See also 
 Liberal Revolution of 1895
 Battle of Guayaquil of 1860